Tovuz may refer to:
 Tovuz, Armenia
 Tovuz District, Azerbaijan
 Tovuz, Azerbaijan